Politotdel is the name of several rural localities in Russia:
Politotdel, Republic of Adygea, a khutor in Koshekhablsky District of the Republic of Adygea
Politotdel, Republic of Bashkortostan, a selo in Shestayevsky Selsoviet of Davlekanovsky District of the Republic of Bashkortostan
Politotdel, Lipetsk Oblast, a settlement in Petrovsky Selsoviet of Dobrinsky District of Lipetsk Oblast
Politotdel, Omsk Oblast, a settlement in Lyubino-Malorossky Rural Okrug of Lyubinsky District of Omsk Oblast